Hotel Continental is a hotel located at Stortingsgaten 24–26, in Oslo, Norway.  It situated across the street from the National Theatre.

History
Hotel Continental and Theatercaféen opened in 1900, right after the opening of the National Theatre.  The business was originally owned by the Foss Brewery (Foss Bryggeri), but was run by different tenants who all had to give up.  Caroline Boman Hansen (1860–1956) and Christian Boman Hansen (1868–1915)  took over the lease in 1909, and within only three years they were able to purchase the establishment. In 1932 and 1961 respectively the hotel and restaurant was expanded, and now occupies a whole block centrally located in the center of Oslo.  Through four generations the same family has built and developed the hotel and the restaurants into what the establishment is today. Elisabeth C. Brochmann is the current and fourth generation owner.  In 1985 she took over the daily operations from her mother Ellen Brochmann.

The Hotel Continental offers 155 individually furnished rooms, many of which are newly renovated. The hotel is a property of international standard and is the only Norwegian member of The Leading Hotels of the World.  In addition, the hotel has conference and banqueting facilities with the capacity of up to 300 guests. The restaurant Theatercaféen is part of the establishment.  The hotel's gourmet restaurant Eik Annen Etage is run by noted chef Ole Jonny Eikefjord in partnership with investor  Petter Stordalen. Hotel Continental has an extensive art collection. In the lobby bar there is a large collection of prints by Edvard Munch.

References

Other sources
Ellen Brochmann  (1998) Til bords og til veggs i Theatercafeen (Oslo)   
Caspar Brochmann (1986) Mors hus, Hotel Continental – en personlig affære gjennom 75 år (Oslo: Grøndahl )

External links
Hotel Continental website
Theatercaféen  website

Hotels in Oslo
Hotels established in 1900
Hotel buildings completed in 1900
1900 establishments in Norway
Hotel Continental, Oslo
Art Nouveau hotels